Burum (also known as Yaknge or Somba-Siawari after its two dialects and Mindik in the language itself) is a Papuan language spoken in Morobe Province, Papua New Guinea. Its closest related language is Borong (also known as Kosorong).

Orthography

References

External links 
 
 
 
 Burum-Mindik Swadesh List

Languages of Morobe Province
Huon languages